Del Castillo is a Latin rock band based in Austin, Texas. The band's name comes from the last name of two brothers, Rick and Mark del Castillo, who founded the group.

History

Del Castillo began as a Latin music style project between two brothers, Rick and Mark del Castillo in the fall of 2000. The brothers, who had always played electric guitar in many different rock bands, had never played together and for the first time ever they began collaborating on songs on nylon string, acoustic guitars. So Rick and Mark decided to record some music together that their family could enjoy and culturally relate to. 
Their musical friend, Alex Ruiz, began adding lyrics to the brothers' instrumentals, and soon after, the other band members joined them. Rick recruited his friend Albert Besteiro, Jr., on bass and friend Cecilio Ruiz III on percussion and vocals, and Mark invited drummer Mike Zeoli, from their other joint project, Milhouse. After receiving very positive and most encouraging responses from everyone who heard the music they created, the project naturally began to evolve into a real band. They began playing regularly around the Austin area. 
The intensity of the band's live performance centers around the two brothers playing guitar. Although not traditionally trained flamenco players, the two have proven to be equal to the likes of the Gipsy Kings, Strunz and Farah, and Santana. The speed, accuracy and expertise of these two, backed by a strong and swift rhythm section, draws fans and newcomers to the foot of the stage every performance.

With the original line-up complete, Del Castillo began writing material, fusing many styles and influences, all while retaining a solid Latin element. The band released their debut CD Brothers of the Castle in 2001, which met with rave reviews from critics and music fans alike.

As the once "project band" solidified into a family of musicians, the band crafted their follow-up release, Vida, which took the band to the next level. And recognition, if not fame, came calling in the form of an invitation to appear on the soundtrack of director Robert Rodríguez's Once Upon a Time in Mexico and the honor of winning "Best Austin Band of the Year" along with six other major awards at the 2002-2003 Austin Music Awards.

The Del Castillo Live DVD, filmed and edited by Robert Rodríguez, was released in early 2004. Filmed at the famous Steamboat on 6th Street in Austin, it captured the fire and intensity of their live performances. Also that year, Quentin Tarantino used a Del Castillo song in Kill Bill Vol. 2, performed by Chingon, Robert Rodríguez's musical collective of some of his closest musical compadres, including members of Del Castillo. Del Castillo, with Robert, performed as Chingon at the premier of the film in Los Angeles.

In the Spring of 2006, Del Castillo released their third CD, Brotherhood, which was immediately acclaimed by the media across the board.

In late 2006, Rick Holeman decided to retire from the band, and the group found a new percussionist, Carmelo Torres. Hailing from Los Angeles, but now living in Austin, Carmelo has proven a strong musician and songwriter.  Carmelo was eventually replaced by home town friend, Jason Murdy in 2010.  Jason has toured extensively with Del Castillo and is now creatively contributing with the other members to writing new music for the band.

On 10 September 2012 Del Castillo announced on Facebook: "Dear Del Castillo Fans, After 12 years of making great music together, the time has come for Del Castillo and Alex Ruiz to go our separate ways. We ask that you continue to support him and we wish him all the luck and success with his future projects. We will be finishing out the rest of this year's shows with guest vocalists and friends, and look forward to taking a much needed BREAK afterwards to regroup, refocus our energies, reorganize our business, and come back sometime next year with newfound energy and excitement, and an even bolder new sound. We hope that you will continue to celebrate Peace, Love, and Latin music with us until then, as we still have some amazing Del Castillo shows lined up for the rest of 2012!"

Currently, Del Castillo is writing and recording brand new music in their Texas studio with Grammy award-winning lead vocalist, Danny Ortiz from Grupo Mazz (2004) and can now be seen performing live with Del Castillo.  New singles are streaming online and they expect to release a new album in 2014 following with a world wide tour to support their highly anticipated new release.  Del Castillo is also featured on an ABC crime/drama show, Killer Women featuring their brand new instrumental single, "Las Seis Cuerdas de Tony Montuno".

Members

 Rick del Castillo – Guitar and vocals
 "Ever since I can remember, music has filled my heart and soul. From my humble beginnings of banging on trash cans at the age of six to touring across the country all through my twenties, music was my one constant companion. I've delved in many genres but playing Spanish/ flamenco music on a nylon guitar with my brother and four other dear friends seems to fuel my muse to infinite measures. All I've learned through my 24 years of playing, touring, producing and engineering has led me to this point." – Rick del Castillo
 Mark del Castillo – Guitar and vocals
 Mark del Castillo grew up in the Rio Grande Valley city of Brownsville, Texas, surrounded by the many musical influences of his family. Inspired by the talent and success of his older brother Rick del Castillo, he began to immerse himself in the study of guitar at age 14. Mark was a self-taught guitarist until he became a Music Major at the University of Texas at Brownsville in 1990. At that time he studied Music Theory, Ear Training, and Applied Guitar as well as joining the University Latin/Jazz band. In 1991, at the age of 19, he joined a cover band called Kickstart and began to build a reputation for himself as a guitarist. After playing with Kickstart for over three years, Mark moved away to pursue further education in Biomedical Science at Texas A&M University. While a student there, he and some friends formed a cover band called Vivid. After graduating in 1996, Mark and Vivid relocated to Austin, Texas and began to play regularly on the 6th Street Circuit, various other cities in Texas, and in Europe. While playing in Vivid, he joined his first original rock band called Milhouse. This was his first collaboration with Mike Zeoli (Del Castillo's drummer). On the first Milhouse CD, which his brother Rick recorded and produced, Mark recorded an instrumental Latin track entitled “Para Mija Linda” showcasing his Spanish style guitar playing. This song became a huge inspiration for him to return to his roots and write more Spanish guitar music. After composing several instrumentals, Mark began working to add lyrics to some of the songs. Mark presented these songs to his brother Rick, who, realizing that they had never worked together, suggested that the Del Castillo brothers combine their creative forces and talents. Mark realized that this is the music that is true to his heart, in his soul, and will always live within him.
 Danny Ortiz – Lead vocals and percussion
 Albert Besteiro – Bass and vocals
 Born in the barrio, "raised on Budweiser and Blues!" (No prior felony convictions.)
 Mike Zeoli – Drums, percussion and vocals
 As a child, Zeoli was fascinated by the entrancing power of rhythm. He was known to entertain his neighborhood friends with daily performances full of dancing and drumming. Every night before falling asleep, he would lie in his bed and dream of playing thunderous, polyrhythmic beats that traveled on magic sound waves into outer space and into heaven.

 "The beats and rhythms I play are like my prayers and gifts to the multi (uni)verse."

 Mike has a diverse background in music and rhythm. He has performed with Ahmad Aladeen, Bobby Shoe, Clark Terry and Louis Bellson. He studied music at S.M.S.U. in Springfield, Missouri and also studied privately with John Cushon (Oleta Adams) and Gary Chaffee (independent).
 Jason Murdy – Percussion and vocals (joined the band in 2010)
Frequent visits to Mexico as a child helped to inspire his rhythmic interests to explore more of a worldly perspective. He latched on to the Latin sound, for its ability to be easily applied to popular music. From 19 till my early 20s, trips to Cuba and touring with Cuban folkloric groups around the states, helped to solidify a deeper understanding of that sound. I’ve been in numerous groups, playing different styles like jazz, funk, hip-hop, and salsa, and love to see how they can be tied together, with an understanding of their roots.

Discography

Albums

Brothers of the Castle (2001) 
 01 Mi Cariño
 02 Spanish Castle Tango
 03 Dias de Los Angeles
 04 Song For Jordan
 05 29/11
 06 La Luz a Mi Paso
 07 Mexican Lounge Lizard
 08 Barrio Blues
 09 Suenos de Ti
 10 El Camino menos Transitado

Vida (2002) 
 01 Don Nicolás
 02 Vida
 03 Sueños Madrigales
 04 Para mi Sobrina
 05 Mi Gitana
 06 Los Caballos
 07 Dame un Momento
 08 Yiddish March
 09 ¿Por Qué?
 10 Back From the Grave + *Barrio Blues (live) [Bonus Hidden Track]

Brotherhood (2006) 
 01 Arena Al Viento
 02 Brotherhood
 03 Este Amor
 04 Ganate El Mundo
 05 Quiereme
 06 Rios Misticos
 07 Maria
 08 Talkin' To Ya
 09 Perdoname
 10 I Never Cared For You [feat. Willie Nelson]
 11 Vida Latina
 12 Que Dolor
 13 Si, Mi Amor
 14 El Corrido de Don Lulai

Del Castillo (self-titled) 2009 
 01 Boricua del Cielo
 02 Everlasting
 03 Castles
 04 Noche Brava
 05 Cafe Sin Leche
 06 Amor Dolor
 07 Anybody Wanna?
 08 Entre Flores y La Luna
 09 Little Angel
 10 Corazon Loco
 11 Light
 12 Home
 13 Anybody Wanna? (Radio Edit)

Infinitas Rapsodias 2012 (CD & Live DVD) 
 01 Lumbres de Babylon (Live)
 02 Fuego Egipcio (feat. Monte Montgomery)
 03 Mujer Angel
 04 Canta de Alma
 05 Brotherhood (feat. Malford Milligan & Leeann Atherton)
 06 Rios Misticos (Dance Mix)
 07 Para Mi Sobrina (feat. Carl Thiel)
 08 Vida (feat. Phoebe Hunt)
 09 Maria (Italian Version)
 10 Perdóname (feat. Carl Thiel & Erik Hokkanen)
 11 Mi Cariño (2012 Version)
 12 Porque (feat. Erik Hokkanen)
 13 Amor Venme a Buscar (Duet with Anna Maria Kaufmann)
 14 Listen to the Music (Live)
 15 What a Wonderful World (Live)
 16 While My Guitar Gently Weeps (Live)

Miscellaneous & Unreleased Songs
 Silent Night (briefly available on the official Del Castillo website)
 Something Pure (an English version of their song “Qué Dolor”)
 The Chuco Went Down To Texas (briefly featured on the official Del Castillo Myspace page)
 The Chant (officially untitled song, beginning with the words "No eres el cuerpo, Eres todo..." that was playing on the official Del Castillo website's home page until Apr 7 2009)
 Consumido (available on iTunes)
 El Gran Fandango

Chingon
Mexican Spaghetti Western (2004)
 01 Se Me Paró
 02 Malaguena Salerosa [La Malaguena]
 03 Fideo Del Oeste [Mexican Spaghetti Western]
 04 Severina
 05 Alacran y Pistolero
 06 Bajo Sexto [Six Below]
 07 Cielito Lindo
 08 Mexican Sausage Link
 09 Siente Mi Amor [featuring Salma Hayek]
 10 Cuka Rocka [Extended]

Compilations
"Voices of a Grateful Nation, Vol 1 - Texas Rock, Blues & Folk" CD (2008)
Volume 1 of the series features the Del Castillo songs "Letter Home" and "La Letra".

Soundtracks
The Cry - La Llorona (2007)
 “La Llorona” with Patricia Vonne (opening and end credits).
 “Talkin’ To Ya” (from Brotherhood CD), “Don Nicolas” and “Sueños Madrigales” (from Vida CD)
This film was never released. It's rumored that it went straight to video.

Kill Bill Vol. 2 Soundtrack (2004)
 “Malaguena Salerosa [La Malaguena]” (Rick and Mark del Castillo/guitar, Alex Ruiz/vocals, Rick Holeman/percussion)
Mexico and Mariachis (2004)
 “Alacran y Pistolero” (Rick and Mark del Castillo/guitar, Alex Ruiz/backing vocals, Rick Holeman/percussion)
 “Severina” (Rick and Mark del Castillo/guitar)
 “Theme from El Mariachi” (Rick del Castillo/guitar, Rick Holeman/percussion)
 “Back To The House That Love Built” (Acoustic) (Rick del Castillo/guitar, Rick Holeman/percussion)
 “Spanish Castle Tango” (Written, Performed, and Produced by Del Castillo)
 The track on this soundtrack is a slightly different edit of the track from their album Brothers of the Castle.
 “Once Upon A Time in Mexico” (Main Titles) (Rick and Mark del Castillo/guitar, Rick Holeman/percussion)
Once Upon a Time in Mexico Soundtrack (2003)
 “Eye Patch” (Rick del Castillo/guitar, percussion; Alex Ruiz/vocals)
 “Guitar Town” (Rick del Castillo/guitar)
 “Church Shootout” (Rick del Castillo/guitar, drums)
 “Dias de los Angeles” (written, performed, produced by Del Castillo)
 The track on this soundtrack is a slightly different edit of the track from their Live DVD.
 “Mariachi vs. Marquez” (Rick del Castillo/guitar)
 “Coup De Etat” (Rick del Castillo/guitar)
 “El Mariachi” (Rick del Castillo/guitar)
 “Siente Mi Amor” (Rick del Castillo/guitar)
 “Cuka Rocka” (Rick and Mark del Castillo/guitar)
Spy Kids 3D: Game Over (2003)
 “Game Over” (Rick del Castillo/guitar)
 “Isle Of Dreams” (Rick del Castillo/guitar)

DVD
Del Castillo Live DVD (2004)
 01 Dias de los Angeles
 02 Sueños Madrigales
 03 El Camino Menos Transitado
 04 Vida
 05 Mi Cariño
 06 Para mi Sobrina

Videography
Maria
Perdoname
Produced by Martina Amende with her company Sapo de Oro in New Mexico. Martina and her videographer Carl Thiel filmed Del Castillo in Geneva, Switzerland for Cartier in 2006.

Awards
Killing Snakes - A short film show in Cannes - 2007, Co-written with very dear and special friend Martina Amende, won a Gold award for best score at Park City, Utah 2008.

 Album of the Year –“BROTHERHOOD” – Austin Music Awards/South By Southwest (2007)
 Best Latin Traditional Band  - Austin Music Awards/South By Southwest (2007)
 Best Latin Traditional Band  – Austin Music Awards/South By Southwest (2006)
 Best Independent Group of the Year - ASCAP Latin Music Awards (2005)
 Best Latin Traditional Band - Austin Music Awards / South By Southwest (2005)
 #1 Best Live Act by Austin Music Pundits - AMP Awards (2004)
 Best Latin Contemporary Band - Austin Music Awards / South By Southwest (2004)
 Best Latin Music Video 2003 for "Suenos Madrigales" from "DEL CASTILLO LIVE" DVD - Austin Music Network Music Video Awards
 7 major awards at Austin Music Awards / South By Southwest (2003):
 AUSTIN BAND OF THE YEAR
 BEST ALBUM OF THE YEAR: "VIDA"
 BEST DRUMS: Mike Zeoli
 AUSTIN SINGLE OF THE YEAR: "VIDA"
 BEST COVER ART: "VIDA"
 RECORD PRODUCER: Rick del Castillo - "VIDA"
 MEXICAN TRADITIONAL - DEL CASTILLO
 Best World Music Band and Best Mexican/Traditional Latino Band - Austin Music Awards / South By Southwest (2002)
 Best World Music Band and Best Mexican/Traditional Latino Band - Austin Music Awards / South By Southwest (2002)
 Honored by the Austin Latin Music Association. Live performance filmed for "Sonidos del Barrios" TV series. (2002)
 Best Latin Rock Band - “Primetime Tejano” TV/Austin (2002)

Special Performances/Media
 Gibson Dark Fire Guitar Launch with Rick and Mark del Castillo - Austin (Dec 15th, 2008)
 Outlaw Trail Concert - Paramount Theatre, Austin (2008)
 Dan Rather Reports: Latino Invasions On Hdnet (2007)
 Austin City Limits Music Festival – Austin (2006)
 Wakarusa Music and Camping Festival – Lawrence, Ks (2006) · Headlined Kgsr T-Shirt Party – Austin (2006)
 Latin Nation TV (2006)
 Willie Nelson’s 4th Of July Picnic – 2 Nights: Carl’s Corner/Ft. Worth (2006)
 George Lopez / ABC-TV (2005) - featuring Rick, Mark, and Alex
 Black Tie and Boots Ball - Washington, DC during Inauguration week (2005)
 American/Latino TV (2004)
 Willie Nelson’s 4th of July Picnic - Ft. Worth (2004)
 Eric Clapton's Crossroads Guitar Festival - Dallas (2004)
 Kill Bill, Vol 2 Premier. Performed in Chingon with Robert Rodriguez - Los Angeles (2004)
 House of Blues with special guest appearance by Robert Rodriguez - Los Angeles (2004)
 Headlined KGSR’s Spring T-Party - Austin (2004)
 “Chingon” Evening with Robert Rodriguez and Bruce Willis & The Accelerators - Austin (2004)
 Willie Nelson’s 4 July Picnic - Ft. Worth (2003)
 Once Upon a Time in Mexico Premier. Robert Rodriguez, Antonio Banderas and Cheech Marin performed with the band - New York (2003)
 Spy Kids 3-D: Game Over World Premier. Robert Rodriguez performed with the band - Austin (2003)
 LATV, in conjunction with debut Los Angeles showcase performances at the Roxy and Conga Room (2003)
 2003 Convention of the National Council of La Raza - Austin (2003)

National Touring
2009-2012
Extensive US and EU promotional touring clubs, festivals, theaters, etc.  Began working with premiere German booking agency, ASS.  Collaborating creatively on new songs in the studio with Los Lonely Boys.  
 2007–2008
National touring throughout the U.S. and in Europe, including many major music festivals such as the Sierra Nevada Music Fest, California Worldfest, and Great Woods Music Fest (Canada).
 2006
National tour: shows with Los Lonely Boys/Indigenous/Styx/deSol/Don Henley. Performed at corporate event for Cartier in Geneva, Switzerland. Set attendance records at The Glenn and Antone’s in Austin.
 2005
Headlined at the Mexico Now! Festival in New York and at the Open House Arts Festival at Kennedy Center in Washington, DC celebrating the Center’s 34th Anniversary. National headline tour, including Las Vegas/Kansas City/St. Louis/Nashville/Virginia Beach/Syracuse/Santa Fe/ Albuquerque. Shows with the Neville Brothers in Austin, and with Buddy Guy in Des Moines.
 2004
Headline shows in New York/Atlanta/Memphis. Shows with Ozomatli in Tucson/New Orleans/ Orlando/Washington, DC/Detroit/Chicago/Minneapolis/Albuquerque/Santa Fe; with Los Lobos in Des Moines/Dallas/Austin/San Antonio/El Paso.

References

External links
 Del Castillo Official website
 Del Castillo Myspace Page
 Del Castillo in Europe

Musical groups from Austin, Texas
Musical groups established in 2000
2000 establishments in Texas